Bob Lutz and Stan Smith were the defending champions but only Smith competed that year with Brian Gottfried.

Gottfried and Smith lost in the quarterfinals to Steve Denton and Tim Wilkison.

Denton and Wilkison won in the final 4–6, 6–3, 6–4 against Sammy Giammalva Jr. and Fred McNair.

Seeds
The draw allocated unseeded teams at random; as a result one seeded team received a bye into the second round.

Draw

Final

Top half

Bottom half

External links
 1981 Fischer-Grand Prix Doubles draw

1981 Fischer-Grand Prix